Olrick Johnson (born August 20, 1977) is a former American football linebacker. He played for the New York Jets and Minnesota Vikings in 1999 and for the New England Patriots in 2000.

References

1977 births
Living people
American football linebackers
Florida A&M Rattlers football players
New York Jets players
Minnesota Vikings players
New England Patriots players